The National Insurance Court is an appeals court for welfare cases in Norway.

It was established by law on 16 December 1966. Its purpose is to judge in cases where decisions by (mainly) the Norwegian Labour and Welfare Service have been appealed. Administratively, it is a part of the Norwegian Ministry of Labour and Social Inclusion.

The leader and deputy leader both need qualifications equivalent to a Supreme Court Justice. The current leader is Knut Brofoss, and the deputy leader is Trine Fernsjø.

References

Courts in Norway
1966 establishments in Norway